Presidential palaces in Indonesia
Indonesia
Palaces presidential